Tetramine is a typical name for a chemical containing four amine groups. Some examples are:

 Triethylenetetramine ("trien")
 Hexamethylenetetramine (hexamine)
 Tetramethylenedisulfotetramine (TETS), a rodenticide banned in most countries

Tetramine is also used as a synonym for the tetramethylammonium cation.